Gaberje is a settlement southwest of Lendava in the Prekmurje region of Slovenia. It lies on the left bank of the Mura River, close to the border with Croatia.

References

External links
Gaberje on Geopedia

Populated places in the Municipality of Lendava